Atthaphon Daengchanthuek (born 19 December 1990) is a Thai weightlifter. He competed for Thailand at the 2012 Summer Olympics in the men's -69 kg division.  He finished in 16th place.

References

Atthaphon Daengchanthuek
Weightlifters at the 2012 Summer Olympics
Atthaphon Daengchanthuek
1990 births
Living people
Atthaphon Daengchanthuek